The 2012 Arab Handball Championship of Champions Club officially named Prince Faisal bin Fahd Handball Championship for Arab Club Champions was the 29th edition of Arab world's premier club handball tournament held in Berkane, Morocco. Al Ahly SC is the defending champion.

Group stage

Group A

Group B

Group C

Group D

Knockout stage

Quarterfinals

Semifinals

Final

References

2012
2012 in handball